Čeminac is a village and municipality in Osijek-Baranja County, Croatia. There are 2,856 inhabitants in the municipality. Čeminac is underdeveloped municipality which is statistically classified as the First Category Area of Special State Concern by the Government of Croatia.

Geography

Čeminac is located in the central part of Croatian Baranja and it is surrounded by the municipalities of: Jagodnjak, Beli Manastir, Kneževi Vinogradi, Bilje, and Darda.

The municipality of Čeminac includes the following settlements:
Čeminac
Grabovac
Kozarac
Mitrovac
Novi Čeminac

History
This Village was established by the Danube Swabians (Schwowe) in 1720 from Fulda and Eisfeld, locally also called Stifolder. The Čeminac area was home to a sizeable Danube Swabians population before the end of World War II. With the Red Army's crossing of the Danube at Batina most of these Germans left, and their property was confiscated by Communist Yugoslavia's government.

Demographics
Ethnic groups in the municipality (2011 census):
88.24% Croats
5.91% Serbs
3.09% Hungarians
0.93% Germans

Coat of arms
The coat of arms of Čeminac is Azure a Lion rampant double-queued Or holding a Plough-share Argent.

References

Municipalities of Osijek-Baranja County
Baranya (region)